Parvibaculum lavamentivorans is a bacterium species from the genus of Parvibaculum which has been isolated from activated sludge in Germany. Parvibaculum lavamentivorans can metabolize linear alkylbenzenesulfonates like alkyldiphenyletherdisulfonate.

References

Further reading

External links
Type strain of Parvibaculum lavamentivorans at BacDive -  the Bacterial Diversity Metadatabase

Bacteria described in 2004